The Sri Lankan High Commissioner to Canada is the Sri Lankan envoy to Canada. Countries belonging to the Commonwealth of Nations typically exchange High Commissioners, rather than Ambassadors. Though there are a few technical differences (for instance, whereas Ambassadors present their diplomatic credentials to the host country's head of state, High Commissioners are accredited to the head of government), they are in practice one and the same office. Sri Lanka also maintains a Consul-General in Toronto.

High Commissioners

 Gunapala Piyasena Malalasekera – (1961 - 1963)
 L. S. B. Perera - (around 1967)
 William de Silva – (1970 – ?)
 Velupillai Coomaraswamy – 
 Henry Thambiah – (September 1975 – December 1977)
 Vernon Mendis – (December 1977 – 1980)
 Rodney Vandergert – (1980 – 1983)
 Ernest Corea (12 August 1983 – 1986)
 General Tissa Weeratunga – (1986–1990)
 Asoka Weerasinghe
 P. B. G. Kalugalla – 
 Walter Rupasinghe - (1990–1993)
 Walter E. Fernando -(1993–1996)
 Ananda Gunasekera -(1996–1999) 
 W. J. S. Karunaratne – (13 June 2006 – ?)
 Daya Perera – (2008–2010)
 Chitranganee Wagiswara – (2010–2014)
 Ahmed Aflel Jawad – (2015–2018)
 Asoka Girihagama – (2018–Present)

See also
List of heads of missions from Sri Lanka

References
The High Commission of Sri Lanka

Sri Lanka
Canada